University College Hospital (UCH) is a teaching hospital in the Fitzrovia area of the London Borough of Camden, England. The hospital, which was founded as the North London Hospital in 1834, is closely associated with University College London (UCL), whose main campus is situated next door. The hospital is part of the University College London Hospitals NHS Foundation Trust

The hospital is on the south side of Euston Road and its tower faces Euston Square tube station on the east side. Warren Street tube station lies immediately west and the major Euston terminus station is beyond 200 metres east, just beyond Euston Square Gardens.

History
In 1826 the London University began emphasising the importance of having medical schools attached to hospitals. Before the hospital opened, only Oxford and Cambridge universities offered medical degrees, and as a consequence relatively few doctors actually had degrees. The hospital was founded as the North London Hospital in 1834 in order to provide clinical training for the "medical classes" of the university, after a refusal by the governors of the Middlesex Hospital to allow students access to that hospital's wards. It soon became known as University College Hospital.

In 1835, Robert Liston became the first professor of clinical surgery at UCH,  
and the first major operation under ether in Europe was conducted at the hospital by Liston on 21 December 1846. UCH was split from UCL in 1905, and a new hospital building designed by Alfred Waterhouse, known as the Cruciform Building, was opened in 1906 on Gower Street. UCH merged with the National Dental Hospital in 1914, and the Royal Ear Hospital in 1920.

George Orwell married Sonia Brownell in 1949, and later died 21 January 1950, in room 65 of the hospital. The hospital was run by the Camden and Islington Area Health Authority from 1974. In 1994, UCH became part of the University College London Hospitals NHS Trust. The hospital site at the Cruciform Building was closed in 1995, despite strikes and an occupation in 1993. The building was purchased by UCL, for use as the home for the Wolfson Institute for Biomedical Research and the teaching facility for UCL bioscience and medical students UCL Medical School.

A new 75,822 m2 hospital, procured under the Private Finance Initiative in 2000, designed by Llewelyn Davies Yeang and built by a joint venture of AMEC and Balfour Beatty at a cost of £422 million, opened in 2005. The sculpture Monolith and Shadow made from a large polished piece of Brazilian granite was placed outside the main entrance to the new hospital in 2005.

In October 2006, the hospital was nominated and made the Building Design shortlist for the inaugural Carbuncle Cup, awarded to "the ugliest building in the United Kingdom completed in the last 12 months", which was ultimately awarded to Drake Circus Shopping Centre in Plymouth. Facilities management services are provided by Interserve.

In November 2008, the £70 million Elizabeth Garrett Anderson Wing was opened, allowing the hospital to offer all women's health services in one place (except some breast and gynaecology services).

Services
 the following services were provided at the hospital:

Accident and emergency
Cancer care (see UCH Macmillan Cancer Centre)
Clinical haematology including stem cell transplantation
Critical care
Dermatology
Endocrinology
General medicine
General neurology
General surgery
Gynaecology
Ophthalmology
Orthopaedics
Paediatrics and adolescents
Rheumatology

The hospital has 665 in-patient beds, 12 operating theatres and houses the largest single critical care unit in the NHS. The Accident and Emergency department sees approximately 120,000 patients a year. It is a major teaching hospital and a key location for the UCL Medical School. It is also a major centre for medical research and part of both the UCLH/UCL Biomedical Research Centre and the UCL Partners academic health science centre.

The urology department moved to University College Hospital at Westmoreland Street, formerly the Heart Hospital, in 2015.

Notable staff
 Sir Thomas Lewis, cardiologist at the hospital
 Marcus Beck
 Agatha Christie
 Jean Smellie
 Elizabeth Joan Stokes (1937–40, 1944–77)
 Ernst Chain Nobel Prize winner

See also
 Francis Crick Institute
 UCL Medical School
 University College London Hospitals NHS Foundation Trust
 Healthcare in London
 List of hospitals in England
 Murder of Alexander Litvinenko (having been transferred here, he died here in November 2006, as a result of polonium-210 poisoning)

References

Sources
  Merrington, William,  (1976)  University College Hospital and its Medical School: a history, Heinemann

External links

 University College London Hospitals NHS Foundation Trust
 UCL Partners
 UCL Medical School
 UCL School of Life & Medical Sciences
 Cruciform Building - History and Design

NHS hospitals in London
Hospitals established in 1834
Hospital buildings completed in 1906
Hospital buildings completed in 2005
Health in the London Borough of Camden
Teaching hospitals in London
University College London Hospitals NHS Foundation Trust
Alfred Waterhouse buildings
Buildings and structures in the London Borough of Camden
1834 establishments in England